Victor "Al" Pease (15 October 1921 – 4 May 2014) was a British-Canadian motor racing driver, born in Darlington, England. He holds the unusual accolade of being the only driver to be disqualified from a Formula One World Championship race due to being too slow.

Biography
Growing up in England, he joined the British Army as a young man, serving in India, Rhodesia and Egypt. After his service, he emigrated to the United States, then Canada, in the 1960s; after a brief career as an illustrator, he took up motorsports.

He participated in three Formula One World Championship Grands Prix, debuting on 27 August 1967. He is the only competitor disqualified from a World Championship race, the 1969 Canadian Grand Prix, for being too slow. He was black-flagged after a series of on-track incidents, the last involving Matra driver Jackie Stewart. In response, Matra owner Ken Tyrrell protested to the officials and had Pease disqualified. At the time, he had completed 22 laps in an uncompetitive car while the leaders had finished 46. His Formula One career was limited to three Canadian Grands Prix, consisting of a non-classification (1967, finishing 43 laps behind the leaders), a failure to start (engine trouble in 1968), and a disqualification (1969), this being notable because he is the only driver to have been disqualified for driving too slowly.

Despite the brief duration of his Formula One career, Pease was highly successful in domestic Canadian motor sport competitions, and was inducted as a member of the Canadian Motorsport Hall of Fame in 1998.

He died on 4 May 2014 at his home in Tennessee.

Complete Formula One World Championship results
(key)

References

External links
Biography at Canadiandriver.com

1921 births
2014 deaths
British Army soldiers
English racing drivers
English Formula One drivers
English illustrators
Canadian racing drivers
Canadian Formula One drivers
Sportspeople from Darlington
British emigrants to Canada
People from Sevierville, Tennessee
British expatriates in the United States